Redcar Central is a railway station on the Tees Valley Line, which runs between  and  via . It is owned by Network Rail and managed by Northern Trains.

History
The line into the town from the west was opened as the Middlesbrough and Redcar Railway on 5 June 1846. The company that constructed it was nominally independent but, in reality, was backed financially by the Stockton and Darlington Railway and the Great North of England Railway, one of the constituent companies of the North Eastern Railway.

The Stockton and Darlington Railway had formally taken over by the time an extension eastwards to Saltburn was completed in August 1861. The route diverged from the original line just short of the existing terminus, part of which remained in use for goods traffic, and a new through station had to be constructed. This was built in a similar style to that used by G.T. Andrews elsewhere on the North Eastern Railway, with an impressive frontage and overall roof.

Initially, the station had only a single platform which led to congestion issues and delays during the summer months, when traffic levels were at their heaviest. A second platform outside the train shed was eventually provided for westbound services by the London and North Eastern Railway in 1935. Today, the original train shed is no longer used, with a replacement eastbound platform having been constructed alongside it at the end of the 1980s.

The level crossing utilised motorised wooden boom gates that swung across the road for many years. Still, these latterly became increasingly unreliable and prone to failure in high winds. In 2015,  Network Rail replaced these with telescopic metal gates — a design unique to this particular location.

Facilities
Redcar Central has a staffed ticket office, open Monday to Saturday (07:50–14:45) but not on Sunday. A self-service ticket machine is available for use outside these hours or for collecting pre-paid tickets. There is also a waiting room that is open Monday to Saturday - these are both on the southern side (platform 1). Platform 2 has a shelter, timetable, poster boards and bench seating.

Platform 1 is further west than platform 2, and a bridge over the track connects the two. There is a level crossing over one of the major roads into Redcar at the end of platform 1, which can also be used to cross over the track. Nearby is the Redcar Station business park, which is housed in the old trainshed, closed since 2016, and now in disrepair.

Station facilities here were improved in 2013. The package for this station included improved platform lighting, renewed station signage, digital information screens and the installation of CCTV. The long-line Public Address system (PA) has been renewed and upgraded with pre-recorded train announcements. Step-free access is available to both sides.

Services

Northern Trains
As of the May 2021 timetable change, the station is served by two trains per hour between Saltburn and Darlington via Middlesbrough, with one train per hour extending to Bishop Auckland. An hourly service operates between Saltburn and Bishop Auckland on Sunday.

Rolling stock used: Class 156 Super Sprinter and Class 158 Express Sprinter

TransPennine Express
As of the May 2021 timetable change, the station is served by an hourly service between Redcar Central and Manchester Airport via York. Most services run via Yarm, with the exception of one early morning arrival, which travels via Darlington. From December 2022 (delayed from May 2022) this service will be extended to and will terminate at Saltburn.

Rolling stock used: Class 185 Desiro

References

Sources

External links
 
 

Railway stations in Redcar and Cleveland
DfT Category E stations
Former North Eastern Railway (UK) stations
Railway stations in Great Britain opened in 1846
Northern franchise railway stations
Railway stations served by TransPennine Express
Redcar
1846 establishments in England